Black Island Channel is a channel  wide between Black Island and Skua Island in the Argentine Islands, Wilhelm Archipelago. It was charted and named in 1935 by the British Graham Land Expedition under John Rymill.

References 

Straits of the Wilhelm Archipelago